The following vessels were in commission, planned or under construction for Her Majesty's Royal Navy in 1981.

Aircraft Carriers
 – .

Destroyers
Type 82 – .

Frigates
 (Type 12I) –
 – .
 – .

Amphibious Units
 –  & .
 Logistic Landing Craft (RCT) – HMAV Ardennes & HMAV Arakan.
 LCM (9) Type – 14 craft
 LCM (7) Type – 2 craft
 Avon-class RPL – Avon, Bude, Clyde, Dart, Eden, Forth, Glen, Hamble, Itchen, Kennet, London & Medway.
 LCVP –
LCVP 1: 9 craft
LCVP 2: 8 craft
LCVP 3: 9 craft
 LCP(R) – 3 craft

Mine Warfare Forces
.
 .
  –
Mine Hunters: Bilderston, Brereton, Brinton, Bronington, Bossington, Gavinton, Hubberston, Iverston, Kedleston, Kellington, Kirkliston, Maxton, Nurton & Sheraton.
Minesweepers: Alfringston, Bickington, Crichton, Cuxton, Glasserton, Hodgeston, Laleston, Pollington, Shavington, Upton, Walkerton, Wotton, Soberton, Stubbington, Lewiston & Crofton.
  – St. David & Venturer.
  – Aveley.
  – Dittisham, Flintham & Thornham.

Ice Patrol Ship

Offshore Patrol Vessels

 Castle-class - Leeds Castle, Dumbarton Castle
 Island-class - HMS Anglesey, HMS Alderney, HMS Jersey, HMS Guernsey, HMS Shetland, HMS Orkney, HMS Lindisfarne

Submarine Service
 –  & .
 – ,  & .
 
Porpoise-class – ,  & .

See also
 List of Royal Navy vessels active in 1982

Notes

References

1981
Royal Navy ships